Rough House Blues is an album by jazz  alto saxophonist Lou Donaldson recorded for the Cadet label in 1964 and performed by Donaldson with an octet conducted and arranged by Oliver Nelson.

The album was awarded 3 stars in an Allmusic review by Ron Wynn who calls it Donaldson's "Best and most ambitious of mid-60s Argo albums".

Track listing
All compositions by Lou Donaldson except as indicated
 "Tippin' In" (Bobby Smith, Marty Symes) - 4:50
 "L.D. Blues" - 3:10
 "Days of Wine and Roses" (Henry Mancini, Johnny Mercer) - 4:25
 "Ignant Oil" - 4:50
 "Rough House Blues" - 6:30
 "Back Talk" - 4:01
 "Huffin' 'N' Puffin'" - 5:30
Recorded in NYC December, 1964.

Personnel
Lou Donaldson - alto saxophone
Dave Burns, Ernie Royal - trumpet
Phil Woods - alto saxophone
Bob Ashton - tenor saxophone
Danny Bank - baritone saxophone
Lloyd Mayers Jr. - Hammond organ 
Richard Davis - bass
Grady Tate - drums 
Oliver Nelson - conductor, arranger

References

Lou Donaldson albums
1965 albums
Cadet Records albums
Albums conducted by Oliver Nelson
Albums arranged by Oliver Nelson
Albums produced by Esmond Edwards